The Move of the Penguin (also known as The Penguin's Move) is a 2013 Italian comedy film written and directed by Claudio Amendola, as his directorial debut. It stars Edoardo Leo, Ricky Memphis, Antonello Fassari and Ennio Fantastichini in the main roles. It premiered at the 2013 Turin Film Festival.

Plot 
Two precarious workers, a pensioner and an old bully discover the sport of curling by chance and convinced of their potential they plan to compete at the 2006 Winter Olympics held in Turin, in which Italy automatically has a qualified team being the host country.

Cast  
 Edoardo Leo as Bruno
 Antonello Fassari as  Neno
 Ricky Memphis as Salvatore
 Ennio Fantastichini as  Ottavio
 Francesca Inaudi as   Eva 
 Damiano De Laurentis  as Yuri 
 Sergio Fiorentini as  Salvatore's father 
 Vittorio Emanuele Propizio  as Fabio 
 Edoardo Purgatori as Bulletto  
 Stefano Fresi as Omone 
 Rita Savagnone as Erania 
 Barbara Scoppa as Lisa

See also
 List of Italian films of 2013

References

External links

2010s sports comedy films
Italian sports comedy films
Curling films
Films about the 2006 Winter Olympics
Films set in 2006
Films set in Rome
Films shot in Rome
Films set in Piedmont
2013 comedy films
2013 films
2010s Italian films